Ephydatia is a genus of sponges belonging to the family Spongillidae.

The genus was first described by Jean Lamouroux in 1816.

The genus has cosmopolitan distribution.

Species:
Ephydatia caatingae Nicacio & Pinheiro, 2015
Ephydatia chileana Pisera & Sáez, 2003
Ephydatia facunda Weltner, 1895
Ephydatia fluviatilis (Linnaeus, 1759)
Ephydatia fortis Weltner, 1895
Ephydatia gutenbergiana (Müller, Zahn & Maidhoff, 1982)
Ephydatia japonica (Hilgendorf, 1882)
Ephydatia kaiseri Rauff, 1926
Ephydatia meyeni (Carter, 1849)
Ephydatia millsii (Potts, 1888)
Ephydatia muelleri (Lieberkühn, 1856)
Ephydatia mülleri (Lieberkühn, 1855)
Ephydatia ramsayi (Haswell, 1883)
Ephydatia robusta (Potts, 1888)
Ephydatia subtilis Weltner, 1895
Ephydatia syriaca Topsent, 1910

References

Spongillidae
Sponge genera